The .25 NAA is a pistol cartridge introduced by the North American Arms company in 2002. It was originally created for use in a smaller and lighter model of their Guardian pistol.

It is based on a .32 ACP case necked down to accept .251-inch diameter (.25 ACP) bullets.

History and design
The cartridge was originally conceived of and prototyped by gunwriter J.B. Wood, and called the "25/32 JBW".

North American Arms and Cor-Bon Ammunition then further developed the cartridge, and the NAA Guardian .25 NAA pistol combination for production in consultation with Ed Sanow.

Introduction
The finalized cartridge and pistol were introduced at the 2004 SHOT Show.

It followed the successful introduction of two other commercial bottleneck handgun cartridges, the .357 SIG in 1994 (which necked a .40 S&W case down to accept .355 caliber bullets); and the .400 Corbon in 1996 (which necked a .45 ACP case down to accept .40 caliber bullets).

Performance
According to NAA's website, the .25 NAA's 35 gr bullets travel faster (1,200 f.p.s.) and hit harder (20% more energy on average) than larger, .32 ACP caliber, bullets.

See also
 .32 NAA
 5.45×18mm

References

External links

 
  at NAA website

Pistol and rifle cartridges
Cor-Bon cartridges